Antikuna is a genus of South American tarantulas. It was first described by Radan Kaderka, N. Ferretti and M. Hüsser in 2021, and it has only been found in Peru.

Species
 it contains seven species:
A. cernickai Kaderka, Ferretti & Lüddecke, 2021 (type) – Peru
A. cimrmani Kaderka, Ferretti & Hüsser, 2021 – Peru
A. cyanofemur Kaderka, Ferretti & Hüsser, 2021 – Peru
A. majkusi Kaderka, Ferretti & Lüddecke, 2021 – Peru
A. sapallanga Kaderka, Ferretti & Lüddecke, 2021 – Peru
A. urayrumi Ferretti, Kaderka & West, 2021 – Peru
A. valladaresi Ferretti, Kaderka & West, 2021 – Peru

See also
 List of Theraphosidae species

References

Theraphosidae genera
Invertebrates of Peru